Numbers in Finnish are highly systematic, but can be irregular.

Cardinal numbers 
The ordinary counting numbers (cardinals) from 0 to 10 are given in the table below. Cardinal numbers may be inflected and some of the inflected forms are irregular in form.

Note: in parentheses, alternative form for counting, and colloquial. The dialectic-colloquial forms may leave the d off and sometimes also the genetive ending n: ; ; ; ; ; . (Corresponding the formal and ordinary counting in Estonian.)

Teens and multiples of ten 
Hyphens are written here to separate morphemes. In Finnish text, hyphens are not written.
one-second., two-second., … nine-second.
"one of the second, two of the second, … nine of the second"
11, 12, … 19

In older Finnish, all numbers were constructed like this. This usage is now considered archaic and the suffix  is treated as a particle instead of meaning "of the second".
 two-ten., one-third., two-third., … nine-third.
 "two tens, one of the third, two of the third, … nine of the third"
 20, 21, 22, … 29
 , 
 one-fourth., one-fifth.
 "one of the fourth, one of the fifth"
 31, 41

Even older forms included  at the end, giving for example  "one of the second decade" for 11 and  "five of the third decade" for 25.

The numbers for tens (20, 30, up to 90) are constructed this way:
 two-ten., three-ten., four-ten., … nine-ten.
  "two tens, three tens, four tens, … nine tens"
 20, 30, 40, 90

In modern Finnish, the numbers 21–29, 31–39, and so on are constructed as in English:
  two-ten. one, two-ten. two, two-ten. three
 "two tens one, two tens two, two tens three"
 21, 22, 23

Hundreds 

Years 
In older Finnish, years were expressed by counting centuries. Use of this convention is archaic. For instance,  "1922", instead of the modern .

Long numbers (like 32534756) are separated in three-digit sections with space beginning from the end of the number (for example 32 534 756). Writing it with letters follow the spacing, in the example (in numbers over one million,  "million" is written separately) . (No dashes, they are only to make the number look clear.)

Inflection 
Numbers can be inflected by case; all parts of the number except  are inflected.

Nouns following a number in the nominative singular are usually in the singular partitive case, if the noun does not need to be in any other case and if the number is any number other than  "one".

If the number is  "one" and it is in the nominative singular then the noun and any adjectives following it will also be in the singular nominative.

But if the noun is in a case besides the nominative, the number and any adjectives following it will be in the same case. For example:

Sets 
Numerals also have plural forms, which usually refer to things naturally occurring in pairs or other similarly well-defined sets, such as body parts and clothing items. Also names of celebrations are usually in the plural. The plural forms are inflected in cases in the same way as the corresponding nouns. For instance:

Numbers from one to seven are apparently original in etymology. The words  "eight" and  "nine" have no confirmed etymology. The old theory is that they are compounds: * "10–2", or "eight" and * "10–1", or "nine", where the reconstructed word  is similar to the Indo-European words for "ten" (*dek´m), but this is phonologically not plausible. Alternatively, they could be * and  "itself, without two" and "without one", where  is a form of  "no" inflected with the Karelian reflexive conjugation ("itself, without two").

Ordinal numbers 
These are the 'ordering' form of the numbers: "first, second, third", and so on. Ordinal numbers are generally formed by adding an -s ending, but first and second are completely different, and for the others the stems are not straightforward:

For teens, the first part of the word is changed; however, the words for "first" and "second" lose their irregularity in "eleven" and "twelve":

For twenty through ninety-nine, all parts of the number get the '-s' ending. 'First' and 'second' take the irregular form only at the end of a word. The regular forms are possible for them but they are less common.

Again, dashes only included here for clarity; the word is properly spelled without them.

Like cardinals, ordinal numbers can also be inflected:

(Literally  || one-of-the-second'.)

Long ordinal numbers in Finnish are typed in almost the same way as the long cardinal numbers. 32534756 would be (in numbers over one million,  "million" is written separately) . (Still, no dashes.)

Names of numbers 
This is a feature of Finnish which does not have an exact counterpart in English (with the curious exceptions of calling a five-dollar bill a fiver and 9 niner in radio communication), but there is a counterpart in colloquial German, for example: 7er, 190er, 205er. These forms are used to refer to the actual number itself, rather than the quantity or order which the number represents. This should be clearer from the examples below, but first here is the list:

Also,  refers to the shape of the number. Some examples of how these are used:

 The 'number three tram' is the  — when you are riding it, you are riding with 
 A magazine has the title 7 and is called 
 My car, a '93 model, is an  when buying spare parts
 The 106 bus is the 
 A 5€ bill may be called , a 10€  bill  (in plural: /), a 20€ , a 100€ bill , etc.

Numbers in the spoken language 
Other short forms can be heard for the tens, where the element  can be heard as "kyt": shortened words like  (30),  (40),  (50),  (60),  (70),  (80),  (90) are not uncommon. When counting a list of items a kind of spoken shorthand can be heard. Thus,  may become  or even , but the forms can vary from person to person.

References 

 Fred Karlsson (2008), "Finnish: An Essential Grammar", Routledge, . Chapter 12, "Numerals".
 Clemens Niemi (1945), "Finnish Grammar", third edition, Työmies Society, Superior, Wisconsin. Lessons XXVI "Cardinal Numbers" and XXVII "Ordinal Numbers". Reprinted with author given as "Niemla. M. Clemenns" , The Stewart Press, London (2008), .

Numerals
Numerals